Imran Majid (Urdu: امران مجید) (born 4 October 1972 in London) is an English professional pool player.

Early life and career
Majid was born in London to parents who emigrated from Lahore, Punjab.

Majid, whose nickname is "The Maharaja", was winner of the 2007 Weert Open and the Italian Euro Tour event in 2006.

He made his Mosconi Cup debut in the 2006 edition in Rotterdam. He and the other rookie of the tournament, David Alcaide, upset the American top duo Earl Strickland and Johnny Archer 7-2 in their doubles confrontation.

Majid practiced much of his early days at Riley's Snooker Club, Hounslow.

Titles
 2010 WPA World Team Championship
 2007 Euro Tour Netherlands Open
 2006 Euro Tour Italy Open

External links
 Industry profile of Imran Majid
 Imran Majid interview from the official 2006 Mosconi Cup website

References

1972 births
Living people
English people of Pakistani descent
English pool players
Sportspeople from London
British sportspeople of Pakistani descent